Heroes for Sale (1933) is an American pre-Code drama film directed by William Wellman, starring Richard Barthelmess, Aline MacMahon, and Loretta Young, and released by Warner Bros. and First National Pictures. The 76-minute original is considered lost; a 71-minute version is available from Turner Entertainment.

Plot
A veteran of World War I, Thomas Holmes (Richard Barthelmess), struggles to make his way in civilian life in almost every way imaginable.  In the opening scene of the film, Tom and his friend are on a mission to gather intelligence by capturing a German soldier.  Tom's friend, the banker's son Roger Winston (Gordon Westcott), in terror, refuses to leave the shell hole so Tom volunteers to go alone.

He captures a German but is apparently killed; in fact, he has only been wounded, and the Germans take him to their hospital to recover.  His friend Roger Winston returns to the safety of American lines with the captured German soldier and is rewarded with a medal for it; his feeble efforts to refuse credit are dismissed as modesty, and he comes home a decorated hero. During Tom's captivity, German doctors treat his pain with morphine and he becomes addicted to the drug.  After Tom returns from the war, Roger offers him a job at his father's bank out of shame.

But Tom's addiction costs him his job. Exposed as an addict, confined and cured in an asylum, he comes out in 1922, unemployed and alone; his mother has died, apparently of shame and grief, while he was away.  Heading to Chicago, he happens upon an apartment over a diner, run by kindhearted Pop Dennis (Charlie Grapewin) and his daughter Mary (Aline MacMahon).  Tom finds a job in a laundry, and a romance with Ruth Loring (Loretta Young). Always the go-getter, Tom makes good, better than the other drivers on his route, and earns a promotion. A fierce radical inventor (Robert Barrat) devises a machine that will make washing and drying clothes easier, and Tom induces his fellow employees to raise the money to pay for patenting it.  The laundry company adopts the machinery, but only on Tom's stipulation that none of the workers at the plant lose their jobs because of it. Success and marriage are his.  Then the president of the firm, the kindhearted Mr. Gibson (Grant Mitchell) dies. The new ownership decides to break the deal and automate the laundry, throwing most of its employees out of work, Tom included.

Furious and resentful, the fired employees march on the plant to destroy the machines, as Tom does his best to stop them.  In the riot with police that follows, Ruth is killed trying to find him, and he is arrested as a ringleader of the mob.  Tom is put away for five years in prison; in the meantime, the invention he helped finance continues to sell nationwide, throwing countless other people out of work.  When Tom gets out, it is 1932, the heart of the Great Depression. Unimaginably rich, he refuses to take the proceeds, which by now amount to over fifty thousand dollars.  Instead, it goes to feed the endless line of hungry and jobless that come seeking a handout at the diner that Pop Dennis and Mary run. When "Red Riots" break out, the local city "Red Squad" arrests Tom and drives him out of town.

Without work, at the mercy of a society in which unemployed men are turned into hobos and every community orders them to keep moving on, Tom finds himself in one hobo shantytown, next to Roger, his old army comrade. Roger Winston, too, has been ruined; his father stole from the bank and when exposure came, killed himself. Roger served time in prison.  Now neither of them has any prospect, any future. The difference is that Tom, in a stirring speech, asserts his faith that America can and will restore itself, that he can lick the Depression.  Still driven on by authorities, with no prospect in sight, he marches ahead, determined that this is not the end. And back at the diner, the line of needy continues to stretch down the street, all of them being fed by the funds he provided, and on the wall a plaque honors him for his gift. The movie closes with his son looking at it and declaring to Mary that when he grows up, he means to be just like his Dad. The message is clear: a hero in war, Tom is a hero still.

Analysis
Heroes for Sale was issued at one of the darkest points in the Depression.  Its views of American society were particularly dark.  Police are there to beat up demonstrators and harass people that they consider dangerous radicals, their squads little better than vigilante gangs. The courts mete out injustice. The bankers are crooks, the honest businessmen outweighed by those who care only for their profits and at the expense of workers. Even the comical radical at the start of the film, having come into money, has become a Social Darwinist, caring nothing for those in need and out only for himself. For audiences expecting a happy ending, the sudden, violent death of Tom's wife Ruth comes as a shock. Where hints are given from the start that Mary is also in love with Tom, and where, in the customary movie formula from later in the 1930s, audiences might expect that they would end up together at the film's close, no such reuniting happens. And yet, unlike 1932's I Am a Fugitive from a Chain Gang, Heroes for Sale shows the shift in mood as the New Deal began. It ends not in despair, but with an expression of hope, not just in Tom's speech, but in the picture of those in need being taken care of. Indeed, in expressing his confidence, Tom refers specifically to Franklin Delano Roosevelt's inaugural address—which, in a Warner Brothers picture, should not be too surprising: Warner Brothers was friendlier to the New Deal than most of the other big studios, just as its films gave far more attention to the big city milieu and members of the working class.

Cast
Richard Barthelmess as Thomas Holmes
Aline MacMahon as Mary Dennis
Loretta Young as Ruth Loring Holmes
Gordon Westcott as Roger Winston
Robert Barrat as Max Brinker
Berton Churchill as Mr. Winston
Grant Mitchell as George W. Gibson
Charles Grapewin as Pa Dennis
Robert McWade as Dr. Briggs
G. Pat Collins as Leader of agitators
James Murray as Blind soldier
Edwin Maxwell as Laundry Company President
Margaret Seddon as Jeanette Holmes
Arthur Vinton as Captain Joyce
Robert Elliott as 'Red' Squad Policeman #1

Critical reception

The film received positive reviews. It holds a 75% approval rating on Rotten Tomatoes, based on 8 reviews, with an average rating of 8.13/10.

Ben Sachs from Chicago Reader in a positive review stated "Wellman crams an astonishing amount of narrative incident into the short running time, with more developments every ten minutes than most contemporary Hollywood productions cover in their entirety. This is also bracingly egalitarian, attacking the hypocrisy of communists and capitalists alike."

References

External links

1933 films
Films set in 1922
Films set in 1932
American black-and-white films
American World War I films
Films about drugs
Films about addiction
1933 drama films
Films directed by William A. Wellman
Warner Bros. films
American drama films
Films with screenplays by Robert Lord (screenwriter)
1930s English-language films
1930s American films
Films scored by Bernhard Kaun
Films about veterans
Great Depression films